The opaque pebblesnail, scientific name Somatogyrus tennesseensis, is a species of very small or minute freshwater snail with an operculum, an aquatic gastropod mollusk in the family Hydrobiidae. This species is endemic to the United States.  The natural habitat of this species is rivers.

References

Molluscs of the United States
Somatogyrus
Gastropods described in 1906
Taxonomy articles created by Polbot